First United Methodist Church is a historic Methodist church at 312 3rd Street in Elyria, Ohio.

It was built in 1925 and added to the National Register in 1979.

References

United Methodist churches in Ohio
Churches on the National Register of Historic Places in Ohio
Gothic Revival church buildings in Ohio
Churches completed in 1925
Churches in Lorain County, Ohio
National Register of Historic Places in Lorain County, Ohio
Churches in Elyria, Ohio